Leadville National Forest was established as the Leadville Forest Reserve by the U.S. Forest Service in Colorado on May 12, 1905 with .  It became a National Forest on March 4, 1907. On May 26, 1930 the entire forest was divided between Arapaho, Cochetopa and Pike National Forests and the name was discontinued.

References

External links
Forest History Society
Forest History Society:Listing of the National Forests of the United States Text from Davis, Richard C., ed. Encyclopedia of American Forest and Conservation History. New York: Macmillan Publishing Company for the Forest History Society, 1983. Vol. II, pp. 743-788.

Former National Forests of Colorado